The Civilian Aircraft Company was a British aircraft manufacturer between 1928 and 1933.

History
The company was formed in 1928 at Burton-on-Trent by Harold Boultbee, a former Handley Page aircraft designer, who became the managing director and chief designer. The company established a factory on the southern perimeter of the Hull Municipal Airport, at Hedon.  The company only produced one aircraft type, the Civilian Coupé a two-seat light monoplane.  After producing six aircraft the company became bankrupt and the factory at Hedon closed in 1933.

Aircraft
1929 - Civilian Coupé

References

Notes

Bibliography

Defunct aircraft manufacturers of the United Kingdom
Vehicle manufacturing companies established in 1928
1928 establishments in England
Vehicle manufacturing companies disestablished in 1933
1933 disestablishments in England
British companies disestablished in 1933
British companies established in 1928